Trniče (in older sources also Terniče) is a village in the Municipality of Starše in northeastern Slovenia. 
The area is part of the traditional region of Styria. It is now included in the Drava Statistical Region.

The village chapel with a small belfry was built in 1890.

References

External links
Trniče on Geopedia

Populated places in the Municipality of Starše